Gustav Kral (4 June 1983 - 11 October 2009) was an Austrian football player.

Career
Kral played in his career for Admira Wacker, Austria Wien, DSV Leoben, SK Schwadorf, Trenkwalder Admira, SV Neuberg and last for UFC Purbach.

Death
Kral died on 11 October 2009 near Lichtenwörth in a car accident; his girlfriend, model Patricia Kaiser, survived the accident.

References

1983 births
2009 deaths
Association football goalkeepers
Austrian footballers
FK Austria Wien players
FC Admira Wacker Mödling players
Austrian Football Bundesliga players
Footballers from Vienna
Road incident deaths in Austria